Reninge Heliport  is a private heliport located near Reninge, West Flanders, Belgium.

See also
List of airports in Belgium

References

External links 
 Airport record for Reninge Heliport at Landings.com

Airports in West Flanders